Mevlüde Öztürk (born December 5, 1988) is a Turkish women's football midfielder, who last played in the Turkish Women's Second Football League for Fatih Vatan Spor in Istanbul with jersey number 8. She is member of the Turkey women's national team since 2006.

Club career

Mevlüde Öztürk obtained her license on May 10, 2006. She played two seasons in the Second League club Kartalspor in her hometown Kartal, Istanbul. After one season with Sakarya Yenikent Güneşspor, she transferred to Lüleburgaz 39 Spor. Between 2009 and 2012, she played four seasons for the Lüleburgaz-based club, which advanced to the Turkish First League after her first season. Öztürk capped 55 times and scored 38 goals during this time. In the second half of the 2012–13, she moved to Trabzon İdmanocağı. In the 2013–14 season, she signed with Ataşehir Belediyespor. After playing two seasons with Ataşehir Belediyespor, she took a break for one year. In the beginning of the  2016–17 season, she transferred to the Second-League team Fatih Vatan Spor, who were promoted to the First league at the end of the season. She last played in the first half of the 2017-19 Women's First Leafue season. She scored in total 50 goals in her club career's 114 matches.

International career
In 2006, Öztürk was admitted to the Turkey women's national team and debuted in the friendly match against Ukraine on March 3, 2006. She took part in ten matches of the all UEFA Support International Tournament between 2007 and 2009. She capped 15 times in the women's national team.

Career statistics
.

Honours
 Turkish Women's First Football league
 Ataşehir Belediyespor
 Runners-up (1): 2013-14

 Turkish Women's Second Football league
 Fatih Vatan Spor
 Winners (1): 2016-17

References 

Living people
1988 births
People from Kartal
Footballers from Istanbul
Turkish women's footballers
Turkey women's international footballers
Women's association football midfielders
Lüleburgaz 39 Spor players
Trabzon İdmanocağı women's players
Ataşehir Belediyespor players
Fatih Vatan Spor players
21st-century Turkish sportswomen